The Lezíria Bridge is a box girder bridge flanked by viaducts and rangeviews that spans the Tagus river and the Sorraia River between Carregado and Benavente, north-east of Lisbon, capital of Portugal. It is the third-longest bridge in Europe (including viaducts) with a total length of 12 km. The main bridge spans 972 m over the Tagus and the Sorraia rivers. The span lengths are 95 m - 127 m - 133 m - 4 × 130 m - 95 m.

The bridge was constructed in 21 months using the balanced cantilever method and opened to traffic in July 2007.

Description

See also 
 25 de Abril Bridge
 Vasco da Gama Bridge
 List of longest bridges
 Megaproject

References 

Cable-stayed bridges in Portugal
Bridges in Portugal
Bridges completed in 2007
Toll bridges in Portugal
Bridges over the Tagus